Spaniophylla is a genus of moths of the family Yponomeutidae.

Species
Spaniophylla epiclithra - Turner, 1917 

Yponomeutidae